These are lists of members of the Tasmanian Legislative Council. Members of the Legislative Council serve six-year terms, with two or three members facing re-election at periodic elections held every year. Due to the difficulty of categorising members without having lists for each individual year, members are categorised here in six-year blocks starting firstly from 1885 and then from 1999.

 1879–1885
 1885–1891
 1891–1897
 1897–1903
 1903–1909
 1909–1915
 1915–1921
 1921–1927
 1927–1933
 1933–1939
 1939–1945
 1945–1951
 1951–1957
 1957–1963
 1963–1969
 1969–1975
 1975–1981
 1981–1987
 1987–1993
 1993–1999
 1999–2005
 2005–2011
 2011–2017
 2017–2023